An Eminent Persons Group is a group of prominent individuals appointed by an organisation to investigate a particular issue.

Examples include 
 ASEAN Eminent Persons Group, Association of Southeast Asian Nations (ASEAN) member countries
 Commonwealth Eminent Persons Group, founded by Commonwealth of Nations
 International Independent Group of Eminent Persons, Sri Lanka

See also 
 EPG (disambiguation)